Caué is a district of São Tomé and Príncipe, on São Tomé Island. Covering , it is the largest of the nation's seven districts in terms of area. In population it is the smallest, with 6,031 residents (2012). The district seat is São João dos Angolares. It is divided into the two statistical subdistricts São João dos Angolares and Malanza.

Geography
The district includes the small islet of Rolas where the equator passes right though the islet's only settlement. Other than Ilhéu das Rolas, the district also includes other islets including Ilhéu Quixibá and Sete Pedras. Much of the district lies within Parque Natural Obô de São Tomé. The most notable natural landmark is the volcanic vent Pico Cão Grande.

Population

Settlements
The main settlement is the town São João dos Angolares. Other settlements are:

Angra Toldo
Dona Augusta
Ilhéu das Rolas
Monte Mário
Ponta Baleia
Porto Alegre
Praia Pesqueira
Ribeira Peixe
Santa Josefina
Vila Clotilde
Vila Malanza

Politics
Caué currently has five seats in the National Assembly.

References

 
Districts of São Tomé and Príncipe
São Tomé Island